George Leopold Stevens (18 March 1910 – 1987) was a footballer who played in the Football League for Crewe Alexandra, Everton, Stockport County, Southend United and guested for Stoke City during World War II. He was born in Wallasey, England.

References

English footballers
New Brighton A.F.C. players
Everton F.C. players
Southend United F.C. players
Stockport County F.C. players
Crewe Alexandra F.C. players
Stoke City F.C. wartime guest players
English Football League players
1910 births
1987 deaths
Association football forwards